The Roman Catholic Diocese of Gumla is a diocese located in the city of Gumla in the Ecclesiastical province of Ranchi in India.

History
 May 28, 1993: Established as Diocese of Gumla from the Metropolitan Archdiocese of Ranchi

Leadership
 Bishops of Gumla (Latin Rite)
 Bishop Michael Minj, S.J. (28 May 1993 – 15 November 2004)
 Bishop Paul Alois Lakra (28 January 2006 – 15 June 2021)

References

External links
 GCatholic.org 
 Catholic Hierarchy 

Roman Catholic dioceses in India
Christian organizations established in 1993
Roman Catholic dioceses and prelatures established in the 20th century
1993 establishments in Bihar
Christianity in Jharkhand
Gumla district